Johnny Ray Mayhane, Jr. (born December 9, 1986) is an American professional basketball player who currently plays for the Saint John Mill Rats of the National Basketball League of Canada (NBL). He played college basketball for Tulane.

Collegiate career 
Mayhane played college basketball at Tulane University.

Professional career 
Mayhane earned All-NBL Canada honors as a Moncton Miracle in the 2013–14 season and was named an All-Star.

References

External links 
Johnny Mayhane at RealGM
Johnny Mayhane at USBasket.com

Living people
1986 births
Shooting guards
Small forwards
Sportspeople from Mobile, Alabama
Tulane Green Wave men's basketball players
Moncton Miracles players
Island Storm players
Saint John Mill Rats players
American men's basketball players
American expatriate basketball people in Canada
Basketball players from Alabama